Coburg High School is a medium-sized, co-educational public high school located in Coburg, Victoria, Australia. 
In 2016 there are approximately 400 students enrolled at Coburg High School and with each new intake of Year 7 students, the school is projected to continue to grow in enrolments and to reach capacity by 2020.

Coburg High School has been an Apple Distinguished School and was one of the first Apple Inc. accredited schools in Australia.

History

Coburg High School was originally established in 1916 on Bell Street in Coburg as one of the first co-educational state secondary schools in Victoria, opening with Ned Sheehan as headmaster and 195 students. Founded during the First World War, the school was used as an emergency hospital during that time. The first ‘Leaving Certificate Class’ graduated from Coburg High School in 1921. Enrolments reached more than 400 students by 1924, 673 by 1955, and 758 by 1985.

Coburg High School was a selective-entry high school from its opening in 1916 until the 1960s. The Air Training Corps School Flight was established at Coburg High School in 1947. The original school magazine was called Echoes. During the 77 years of the original Coburg High School, there were two school songs — "The Best School of All" and "Loyal in All".

After 77 years, the original Coburg High School was closed in 1993 before its merger with Preston Secondary College (formerly, Preston Technical School) in 1994 to become Coburg-Preston Secondary College. Coburg East Primary school was then merged with the Secondary College in 1997 to form Moreland City P-12 College. In 2004, Moreland City College was closed. In 2005, fire damaged the original school building. In 2007, Coburg Senior High School was established as a school for students in Years 10 to 12. By 2012, there were approximately 230 students at Coburg Senior High School.

In 2015, Coburg Senior High School was renamed Coburg High School and was re-established as a Years 7 to 12 school, welcoming its first intake of 160 Year 7 students. In 2016, there were approximately 170 Year 7 students and 160 Year 8 students, and about 60 students in Years 10 to 12, with enrolments continuing to grow. 

The reincarnated Coburg High School is located on the site of the former Moreland City College. With the re-establishment of Coburg High School, a state government grant of $3.5 million was allocated to the school for capital works to renovate Building C.

In October 2016, reunion celebrations were held at Coburg High School to mark the centenary of the opening of the original school. A time-capsule from the 1980s was opened as part of the centenary celebrations.

External links
  Coburg High School homepage
 Coburg High School VRQA registration
 Coburg High School annual report
 Coburg High School Historical Society

References 

Public high schools in Victoria (Australia)
1916 establishments in Australia
Buildings and structures in the City of Merri-bek